Memento Mori was a Swedish band that is mainly doom metal but has some power metal influences. The band was founded by Messiah Marcolin and Mike Wead in 1992 after Messiah left Candlemass. After two albums, however, Messiah left the band; the third album was sung by Kristian Andrén. For the fourth album, Messiah returned. After that album, the band broke up. All albums were released by Black Mark.

Discography
 Rhymes of Lunacy (1993)
 Life, Death, and Other Morbid Tales (1994)
 La Danse Macabre (1996)
 Songs for the Apocalypse, Vol. 4 (1997)

Former members
 Messiah Marcolin - vocals
 Mike Wead - guitars
 Nikkey Argento - guitars
 Marty Marteen - bass
 Tom Bjorn - drums
 Kristian Andrén - vocals
 Miguel Robaina - keyboards
 Snowy Shaw - drums
 Johan Billerhag (a.k.a. "Billy St. John") - drums

Swedish doom metal musical groups
Musical groups established in 1992
Musical groups disestablished in 1997
Musical quintets
Black Mark Production artists